Mario Viens (born August 7, 1955) is a Canadian former professional ice hockey goaltender. He won the Michel Brière Memorial Trophy as the Most Valuable Player in the Quebec Major Junior Hockey League for his outstanding play with the Cornwall Royals during the 1974–75 QMJHL season.

References

External links

1955 births
Buffalo Norsemen players
Canadian ice hockey goaltenders
Cornwall Royals (QMJHL) players
Living people
Los Angeles Kings draft picks
Maine Nordiques players
Toronto Toros draft picks
Toronto Toros players
Ice hockey people from Ontario
Sportspeople from Cornwall, Ontario